Nautilia is a genus of bacteria from the family of Synergistaceae.

References

Campylobacterota
Bacteria genera